Liederbach (in its upper course: Reichenbach) is a river of Hesse, Germany. It is a right tributary of the Main near Höchst.

See also
List of rivers of Hesse

References

Rivers of Hesse
Rivers of the Taunus
Rivers of Germany